Arthur Cambier (born 30 August 1882, date of death unknown) was a Belgian footballer. He played in one match for the Belgium national football team in 1907.

References

External links
 

1882 births
Year of death missing
Belgian footballers
Belgium international footballers
Association football defenders
Footballers from Bruges